Music from and Inspired by the Motion Picture The Wood is the soundtrack Rick Famuyiwa's 1999 film The Wood. It was released on July 13, 1999 through Jive Records and consisted of hip hop and R&B music. The album peaked at number 16 on the Billboard 200, number 2 on the Top R&B/Hip-Hop Albums, and went Gold by the Recording Industry Association of America on August 25, 1999.

It spawned four charting singles with music videos to promote the film: "Neck uv da Woods" by Mystikal and Outkast (directed by Little X), "Crave" by Marc Dorsey (directed by Tim Story), "Think About You" by Blackstreet (directed by Malik Sayeed) and "I Wanna Know" by Joe (directed by Bille Woodruff).

Track listing 

Sample credits
Track 7 contains a sample of "Spoonin' Rap" by Spoonie Gee
Track 17 contains a sample of "Love T.K.O." by Teddy Pendergrass

Notes
Tracks 3–7, 11-14 are not contained in the film.

Charts

Weekly charts

Year-end charts

Certifications

References

External links

1999 soundtrack albums
Comedy film soundtracks
Hip hop soundtracks
Jive Records soundtracks
Albums produced by Marley Marl
Albums produced by Swizz Beatz
Albums produced by Teddy Riley
Albums produced by Mannie Fresh
Albums produced by Scott Storch
Albums produced by Trackmasters
Albums produced by Luther Vandross
Albums produced by Organized Noize
Albums produced by Larry Smith (producer)
Albums produced by Larry Campbell (musician)